Louisiana's 2nd State Senate district is one of 39 districts in the Louisiana State Senate. It has been represented by Democrat Ed Price since a 2017 special election to replace disgraced incumbent Democrat Troy Brown.

Geography
District 2 stretches across a majority-Black swath of Acadiana between New Orleans and Baton Rouge, including parts of Ascension, Assumption, Iberville, Lafourche, St. Charles, St. James, St. John the Baptist, and West Baton Rouge Parishes. LaPlace, Thibodaux, Donaldsonville, and Gonzales are entirely or partially located within the district.

The district overlaps with Louisiana's 2nd and 6th congressional districts, and with the 18th, 29th, 51st, 55th, 57th, 58th, 60th, 81st, and 88th districts of the Louisiana House of Representatives.

Recent election results
Louisiana uses a jungle primary system. If no candidate receives 50% in the first round of voting, when all candidates appear on the same ballot regardless of party, the top-two finishers advance to a runoff election.

2019

2017 special

2015

2011

Federal and statewide results in District 2

References

Louisiana State Senate districts
Ascension Parish, Louisiana
Assumption Parish, Louisiana
Iberville Parish, Louisiana
Lafourche Parish, Louisiana
St. Charles Parish, Louisiana
St. James Parish, Louisiana
St. John the Baptist Parish, Louisiana
West Baton Rouge Parish, Louisiana